The Kamaladevi Chattopadhyay NIF Book Prize is awarded annually for non-fiction books on modern or contemporary India which were published in the preceding year. The Prize was established in 2018 by the New India Foundation, a charitable trust that also awards research fellowships and book grants to Indian scholars and writers. Winners of the prize include politician and writer Jairam Ramesh, and historian Ornit Shani, and authors shortlisted for the prize include Aanchal Malhotra, Sujatha Gidla, Katherine Eban, Christophe Jaffrelot, Piers Vitebsky, Alpa Shah, and Manoranjan Byapari.

Establishment 
The Kamaladevi Chattopadhyay NIF Book Prize was established by the New India Foundation, a charitable organisation which also awards research fellowships and book grants for Indian writers. Trustees of the foundation include political scientist Niraja Gopal Jayal, businessmen Manish Sabharwal and Nandan Nilekani, historians Ramachandra Guha, and Srinath Raghavan. The foundation provides grants for scholars and writers who are writing non-fiction and fiction books about India, and also provides translation grants for works translated from Indian languages. The Kamaladevi Chattopadhyay NIF Book Prize was established in 2018, to recognise and foster non-fiction writing about India, and is awarded annually for books published in the preceding year. Books which have already been the subject of fellowships awarded by the foundation are ineligible, and the jury is composed of the foundation's trustees.

Recipients

References 

Indian literary awards